T.A. Pai Management Institute (TAPMI) is a private autonomous business school in India. It was established in 1980 and is located in the university town of Manipal in Karnataka. It is the fifth management institute in India with dual accreditation of Association to Advance Collegiate Schools of Business (AACSB) and Association of MBAs (AMBA).

History
Established in 1980 in Manipal by Shri. T. A. Pai, TAPMI's first fully residential two-year PGDM Program commenced in the year 1984-85 with a batch size of 48.

It also has 2 year fully residential BKFS (Banking and Financial Services), HR (Human Resources) and Sales (Marketing and Sales) Management courses.

TAPMI was accredited by the Association to Advance Collegiate Schools of Business on 29 April 2012 and the Association of MBAs on 4 December 2018.

Programmes

TAPMI's programmes include a two-year residential post-graduate diploma in management including specialization in human resources, banking and financial services, marketing & sales, a Ph. D. programme, and an 18-month joint TAPMI and University of Dubai MBA programme. TAPMI collaborates with a number of business organisations to provide continuous learning and education to their executives.

TAPMI conducts student and faculty exchanges with Sheffield Hallam University, UK, Macquarie University, Australia  and with the Asian Institute of Management, Manila.

Rankings

TAPMI was ranked 35 among business schools in India by the National Institutional Ranking Framework in 2021. It was also ranked 7 among private MBA institutions in India by Outlook Indias "Top 150 Private MBA Institutions" of 2020.

Events
Events conducted by student committees include TAPMI Quiz on the Beach™,India's biggest on campus quizzing event, Atharva, the annual international B-School festival, Disha - the annual HR conclave, 'Genesis' which is a cultural event celebrated with grandeur styles and Brandscan, which is organised in 3 formats Urban(In Bangalore), Semi Urban(Manipal), Rural(Kundapura) to understand consumer behavior. The JoyFest (Joy of Giving), organized by the Social Endeavor Group of TAPMI to help the underprivileged, goes on for a week.

They also have fully student managed investment forums SAMNIDHY and SMIC that gives students opportunity to gain real time experience in stock markets

Defi

Defi, the OMEGA’s (Organization for Managerial Entrepreneurial Guidance and Assistance) flagship event which is a platform for the students put on their entrepreneurial hats and have a firsthand experience in running businesses for a couple of days. OMEGA is a Students Consulting Wing. OMEGA supports and partners with small and medium scale enterprises, traders who are in and around Manipal, Udupi and Mangalore in their business. The committee has expanded its consulting operation to provide service to Indian corporates. Entrepreneurs approach OMEGA with their problems or projects and OMEGAns (Student Members) solve their problem or help them in growing their business. The students also seek guidance from the faculty members for solving the issues. OMEGA provides a platform for interaction between students and local entrepreneurs. The project undertaken by OMEGA ranges from various operational issues to strategic decisions.

Publications
Pratibimb, The TAPMI's e-Magazine, is the conglomeration of the various specializations in MBA (Marketing, Finance, HR, Systems and Operations).
 UPDATE - annual magazine released at the Convocation with a comprehensive report on all the activities and achievements of the institute, its faculty, staff, students and alumni.
 TAPMI Research Newsletter at half yearly intervals in March and September.
 A newsletter covers various activities and events that have taken place in the TAPMI community. It covers the faculty publications and awards, students and alumni.
Alt+T, is a monthly issue by TAPMI’s Literary and Media committee. It includes articles by the professors and the students on any topic of their choice.

References

External links
 

Business schools in Karnataka
Manipal Academy of Higher Education schools
Educational institutions established in 1980
1980 establishments in Karnataka